Sriracha (  or  ;) is a type of hot sauce or chili sauce made from a paste of chili peppers, distilled vinegar, garlic, sugar, and salt.

Use

In Thailand, sriracha is frequently used as a dipping sauce, particularly for seafood and omelets. In Vietnamese cuisine, sriracha appears as a condiment for phở and fried noodles, as a topping for spring rolls (chả giò), and in sauces.

Sriracha is also eaten in soup, on eggs and burgers. Jams, lollipops, and cocktails have all been made using the sauce, and sriracha-flavored potato chips have been marketed.

Origin
The sauce was first produced in the 1940s by a Thai woman named Thanom Chakkapak in the town of Si Racha (or Sriracha), Thailand.

Variations

Thailand

In Thailand, the sauce is most often called sot Siracha and only sometimes nam phrik Siracha. Traditional Thai sriracha sauce tends to be tangier in taste, and runnier in texture than non-Thai versions.

In a Bon Appétit magazine interview, US Asian-foods distributor Eastland Food Corporation asserted that the Thai brand of hot sauce Sriraja Panich, which Eastland distributes, is the original "sriracha sauce" and was created in Si Racha, Thailand, in the 1930s from the recipe of a housewife named Thanom Chakkapak.

United States
In the United States, sriracha is associated with a sauce produced by Huy Fong Foods and is sometimes referred to as "rooster sauce" or "cock sauce" from the image of a rooster on the bottle. Other variations of sriracha have appeared in the US market, including a sriracha that is aged in whiskey barrels. The Huy Fong Foods Sriracha was first produced in the early 1980s for dishes served at American phở restaurants.

Various restaurants in the US, including Wendy's, Applebee's, P.F. Chang's, Jack in the Box, McDonald's, Subway, Taco Bell, White Castle, Gordon Biersch, Chick-fil-A, Firehouse Subs, Noodles & Company, Starbucks, and Burger King have incorporated sriracha into their dishes, sometimes mixing it with mayonnaise or into dipping sauces. Blue Diamond, a leading producer of almond products, markets a sriracha flavor alongside their other flavors. The word "sriracha" is considered a generic term.

In popular culture

 In 2013, American filmmaker Griffin Hammond released Sriracha, a documentary about the origin and production of sriracha sauce.
 Rapper Tech N9ne released the song Sriraracha in 2016, in which he compares his style of rhyme to the condiment.
 In 2017, the Korean trio Bang Chan, Changbin and Han debuted in the group 3Racha, taking inspiration from the sauce. Now they are part of the k-pop group Stray Kids.

See also

 List of hot sauces
 List of sauces
 Nam chim—Thai dipping sauces
 Nam phrik—Thai chili pastes

References

External links 
 

Chonburi province
Chili sauce and paste
Thai cuisine
Vietnamese cuisine
Hot sauces